Regmi is a surname of Garhwali people, Kumaoni people and Nepali people of Brahmin caste. 

Notable people with the name include:

 Basanta Regmi, Nepali cricketer
 Dilli Raman Regmi, Nepali Congress politician and historian
 Khil Raj Regmi, former Nepali Acting Prime Minister and Chief Justice
 Mahesh Chandra Regmi, Nepali historian[1]
 Sarala Regmi, Nepali politician
 Shiva Regmi, Nepali film director, producer and writer

Nepali-language surnames